The Superpower (天降財神) is a TVB Scifi television series, premiered in Hong Kong in 1983.

Synopsis
An extraterrestrial alien who crashed from space landed in Hong Kong, nearly dying from the crash.  He survived by inhabiting a human corpse (Chow Yun-fat) and was saved by Kwok Hak-cung, (Tony Leung) who gave him water.  The alien then helped Kwok in things  such as winning lotteries and other aspects of life.

Cast

References

1983 Hong Kong television series debuts
1983 Hong Kong television series endings
TVB dramas
1980s Hong Kong television series
Cantonese-language television shows